Osopsaron is a genus of duckbill fishes.

Species
There are three species included with the genus Osopsaron:

 Osopsaron formosensis Kao & Shen, 1985
 Osopsaron karlik Parin, 1985
 Osopsaron verecundum (Jordan & Snyder, 1902)

References

Percophidae